Flocken may refer to:

People 
 Andreas Flocken (1845-1913), German entrepreneur and inventor

Media 
 Flocking (film), film (Swedish: Flocken)